Wheeler is a city, and the county seat of Wheeler County, Texas, United States, located on the eastern border of the Texas Panhandle. The population was last reported at 1,592 in the 2010 census.

History
Both the town of Wheeler and Wheeler County are named for Royall Tyler Wheeler, who was a Chief Justice of the Texas Supreme Court.

Geography
The town is positioned 3 miles northwest from the center of the county, 100 miles east of Amarillo, TX, and 12 miles west of the Texas-Oklahoma states' line.  According to the United States Census Bureau, Wheeler has a total township-area of 1.5 square miles (4.0 km), all of it land.

Climate
According to the Köppen climate classification system, Wheeler has a semiarid climate, BSk on climate maps.

Demographics

2020 census

As of the 2020 United States census, there were 1,487 people, 568 households, and 415 families residing in the city.

2000 census
As of the census of 2000, 1,378 people, 520 households, and 365 families resided in the city. The population density was 900.4 people per square mile (347.7/km). The 612 housing units averaged 399.9 per square mile (154.4/km). The racial makeup of the city was 85.05% White, 1.81% African American, 0.44% Native American, 0.15% Asian, 10.60% from other races, and 1.96% from two or more races. Hispanics or Latinos of any race were 18.07% of the population.

Of the 520 households, 33.5% had children under the age of 18 living with them, 58.8% were married couples living together, 8.5% had a female householder with no husband present, and 29.8% were not families. About 28.3% of all households were made up of individuals, and 18.5% had someone living alone who was 65 years of age or older. The average household size was 2.48 and the average family size was 3.04.

In the city, the population was distributed as 25.0% under the age of 18, 8.4% from 18 to 24, 21.4% from 25 to 44, 23.4% from 45 to 64, and 21.8% who were 65 years of age or older. The median age was 41 years. For every 100 females, there were 88.0 males. For every 100 females age 18 and over, there were 83.7 males.

Males had a median income of $27,679 versus $16,723 for females. The per capita income for the city was $17,224. About 6.8% of families and 10.2% of the population were below the poverty line, including 12.6% of those under age 18 and 10.7% of those age 65 or over.

Education
Wheeler Public Schools are part of the Wheeler Independent School District. One elementary school, one junior high school, and one high school (Wheeler High School) serve the district.

Notable people

 Alan Bean, NASA astronaut, artist, and, as a member of Apollo 12 became the fourth man to walk on the Moon. Bean was born in Wheeler, and a street in Wheeler is named in his honor
 Jack Frye, Aviation Pioneer and President of TWA was raised and is buried in Wheeler
 John B. Harrison, a native of Texas, attorney, served as County Judge for Wheeler County until he moved to what would become Oklahoma Territory in 1896
 Don Rives, a linebacker for Texas Tech and the Chicago Bears, was born in Wheeler
 Mindy Brashears, the former Under Secretary for Food Safety at the U.S. Department of Agriculture

Gallery

References

External links

 City of Wheeler
 Wheeler County

Cities in Wheeler County, Texas
Cities in Texas
County seats in Texas